The Los Angeles Cyber Lab, a 501(c) nonprofit organization, founded in August 2017, with Cisco Systems, is a "public-private cybersecurity initiative designed to help the (small and mid-sized) business community stay ahead of security threats"

In 2018, Department of Homeland Security awarded LA Cyber Lab a $3 million grant.

In 2019, with the backing of IBM, it added a threat-intelligence Web portal and an app for Android and IOS.

Cyber NYC, is New York City's similar cybersecurity initiative. New York City Cyber Command is a city government agency.

Zimperium enterprise mobile security apps are sponsored by State of Michigan,  NYC Cyber Command and Los Angeles Metro Rail.

References

External links 
 LA Cyber Lab
 Cybersecurity Stakeholder Agencies - Los Angeles Area Fire Chiefs Association
 Impressionist Films. LA Cyber Lab - Ad Spot 1 - Vimeo

Non-profit organizations based in the United States